Malcolm Parr was Archdeacon of Warwick from 1945 until 1958.

Parr was educated at the University of London and Ridley Hall, Cambridge; and ordained in 1915. After a curacy in Great Yarmouth he was the Vicar of Bishop Latimer Memorial Church, Winson Green from 1922 to 1926. He was the incumbent at St Nicholas, Radford, Coventry from 1926 to 1929 and of Holy Trinity, Leamington Spa until his appointment as Archdeacon.

References

Alumni of Ridley Hall, Cambridge
20th-century English Anglican priests
Archdeacons of Warwick
Year of birth missing
Year of death missing